The following railroads operate in the U.S. state of Tennessee.

Common freight carriers
BNSF Railway (BNSF)
Canadian National Railway (CN) through subsidiary Illinois Central Railroad (IC)
Caney Fork and Western Railroad (CFWR)
Chattooga and Chickamauga Railway (CCKY)
CSX Transportation (CSXT)
East Chattanooga Belt Railway (ECTB)
EACH Railroad (EACH)
East Tennessee Railway (ETRY)
Heritage Railroad Corporation (HR)
Kansas City Southern Railway (KCS)
Knoxville and Holston River Railroad (KXHR)
KWT Railway (KWT)
Mississippi Central Railroad (MSCI)
Mississippi Tennessee Railroad (MTNR)
Nashville and Eastern Railroad (NERR)
Nashville and Western Railroad (NWR)
Norfolk Southern Railway (NS) including subsidiaries Alabama Great Southern Railroad (AGS), Central of Georgia Railroad (CG), Cincinnati, New Orleans and Texas Pacific Railway (CNTP), Tennessee Railway (TENN), and Tennessee, Alabama and Georgia Railway (TAG)
R.J. Corman Railroad/Memphis Line (RJCM)
R.J. Corman Railroad/Tennessee Terminal (RJCK)
Sequatchie Valley Railroad (SQVR)
South Central Tennessee Railroad (SCTR)
Tennessee Southern Railroad (TSRR)
Tennken Railroad (TKEN)
Tyner Terminal Railroad (TYNT)
Union City Terminal Railroad (UCTY)
Union Pacific Railroad (UP)
Walking Horse and Eastern Railroad (WHOE)
West Tennessee Railroad (WTNN)

Private freight carriers
Franklin Industries
Lhoist North America
Southern Freight Logistics
Tennessee Valley Authority

Passenger carriers

Amtrak (AMTK)
Tennessee Overhill Heritage Association
Music City Star

Defunct railroads

Private carriers
Babcock Lumber Company
Dayton Iron and Coal Company

Electric
Bristol Traction Company
Chattanooga and Lookout Mountain Railway
Fountain Head Railroad
Memphis Street Railway
Nashville–Franklin Railway

Not completed
Brownsville and Ohio Railroad
Holly Springs, Brownsville and Ohio Railroad
Memphis and Knoxville Railroad
Memphis and Raleigh Railroad

Notes

References
Association of American Railroads (2003), Railroad Service in Tennessee (PDF). Retrieved May 11, 2005.

Tennessee
Railroads